Arenopsaltriini is a tribe of cicadas in the family Cicadidae, found in Australia. There are at least two genera and about seven described species in Arenopsaltriini.

Genera
These two genera belong to the tribe Arenopsaltriini:
 Arenopsaltria Ashton, 1921 c g
 Henicopsaltria Stål, 1866 c g
Data sources: i = ITIS, c = Catalogue of Life, g = GBIF, b = Bugguide.net

References

Further reading

 
 
 
 
 
 
 
 
 
 
 

 
Cicadinae
Hemiptera tribes